Hirnyk means Miner in Ukrainian and can refer to:

Populated places
 Hirnyk, Donetsk Oblast, a city and suburb of Selydove in Donetsk Oblast of eastern Ukraine
 Hirnyk, Lviv Oblast, a town and suburb of Chervonohrad in Lviv Oblast of western Ukraine
 Hirnyk, Luhansk Oblast, a town and suburb of Rovenky in Luhansk Oblast of eastern Ukraine

Sports teams
 FC Hirnyk Kryvyi Rih
 FC Hirnyk-Sport Komsomolsk

Surname
 Hirnyk (surname)

See also
 Gornik (disambiguation)
 Gornyak (disambiguation)